Årstad is a former municipality in the old Hordaland county in Norway. The  municipality existed from 1838 until 1915 when it was merged into the city of Bergen. The municipality of Årstad (historically spelled Aarstad) was a southern suburb of the city of Bergen, mostly located in the valley to the south of the bay Store Lungegårdsvannet and the Puddefjorden all the way south to the village of Nattland.  The administrative centre of Årstad was the village of Kronstad.  The mountain Ulriken lies to the east of Årstad and the mountain Løvstakken lies to the west.  The municipality is named after the medieval farm Alrekstad, located on this site.  The area of the old municipality somewhat corresponds to the present-day borough of Årstad in the city of Bergen.

History
The parish of Aarstad was established as a municipality 1 January 1838 (see formannskapsdistrikt law). Originally, it sat south of the city of Bergen and south of the municipality of Bergen Landdistrikt. Årstad and the city of Bergen worked closely together from the start since both made up one large urban area.  In fact, most of Årstad had been part of the Bergen Police District since 1808.

The merger happened after a long political process, following decades of close cooperation between the two municipalities. The merger also moved Årstad from Søndre Bergenhus county to Bergen county.

See also
List of former municipalities of Norway

References

Geography of Bergen
Former municipalities of Norway
1838 establishments in Norway
1915 disestablishments in Norway